Red Love may refer to
 Red Love (1921 film), an Italian silent film
 Red Love (novel), a Russian novel
 Red Love (1982 film), a German film adaptation
 Red Love (1925 film), an American silent film
 Red Love (1952 film), an Italian drama film
 Redlove apples Apple cultivar